Leicester Celtic A.F.C. is an Irish association football club  based in Rathfarnham, Dublin.  The club's senior team compete in the Leinster Senior League where they have enjoyed reasonable success. Youth sides compete in the Dublin and District Schoolboys League as well as the FAI Youth Cup.

History
Leicester Celtic was founded in 1967 by Michael Flaherty  and Father C.F. Lee, then a curate in the Rathgar parish. In return for financial assistance from the Parish, the name of a local street, Leicester Avenue, was to be used in the club name.  In their first season Celtic fielded one team at under-17 level. The following season two teams at under-14 and under-18 represented the club. Since 2009 Leicester Celtic has been affiliated with the Welsh football club Swansea City AFC.

Ground
Leicester Celtic moved around many times in the early years, playing home games in Bushy Park and Marlay Park before eventually moving to the current base of Loreto Park in the 1980s. In 2003 an investment of €1 million saw Leicester Celtic build their own all weather floodlit playing facility and clubhouse beside the pitches in Loreto.

Notable former players

Republic of Ireland internationals
  Damien Duff
  Richie Sadlier
 Gavin Bazunu

Republic of Ireland under-21 internationals
  Barry Roche

League of Ireland XI players
  John Coady
  Barry Murphy 
  Paul Osam

Ireland internationals
The following former Leicester Celtic players represented Ireland at various other sports. 
  Ray Cosgrove – Dublin GAA player, represented Ireland international rules football team 
  Scott Evans – badminton player, represented Ireland at the 2008 Summer Olympics and 2012 Summer Olympics
  Eric Miller – represented Ireland national rugby union team and the British and Irish Lions
  David Gillick – international track and field athlete

References

 
Association football clubs in Dún Laoghaire–Rathdown
Leinster Senior League (association football) clubs
1967 establishments in Ireland
Association football clubs established in 1967